Anghelache Donescu (born 18 October 1945) is a Romanian equestrian and Olympic medalist. He was born in Bucharest. He competed in dressage at the 1980 Summer Olympics in Moscow, where he won a bronze medal with the Romanian team, along with Petre Roșca and Dumitru Velicu. He also placed sixth in individual dressage at the 1980 Olympics.

References

External links

1945 births
Living people
Sportspeople from Bucharest
Romanian male equestrians
Romanian dressage riders
Olympic equestrians of Romania
Olympic bronze medalists for Romania
Equestrians at the 1980 Summer Olympics
Olympic medalists in equestrian
Medalists at the 1980 Summer Olympics
20th-century Romanian people